Aztarac is a  scrolling multidirectional shooter with color vector graphics. It was developed by Tim Stryker (1954-1996) and released in arcades by Centuri in 1983. The player commands an intergalactic race of mutant humans whose mode of transport is a tank. Its turret is independently controlled, allowing the player to move in one direction while shooting in another. The mission is to guard space outposts from hordes of incoming enemy ships. Aztarac color vector graphics were impressive at the time of release, and a circular plastic lens over the screen accentuates the visuals. Few machines were produced, though the exact number is unclear. Centuri only developed two vector games; Aztarac was the second.

Gameplay

Four outposts are located in the center of a scrolling playfield, and the player must protect them from waves of enemy attackers. A flight-style joystick moves the player's tank; a trigger on the joystick shoots; a separate knob rotates the tank's turret independently of movement; and a button activates a scanner which shows where offscreen enemies are.

Reception
According to Tony Temple of The Arcade Blogger, Aztarac was an obscure release:

Legacy
One of the few Aztarac machines still in existence was discovered and restored in 2016. It turned out to be the one originally owned by the game's creator, Tim Stryker.

Dennis Bartlett of Iowa, USA, scored a world record 142,390 points on Aztarac on February 11, 1984.

References

External links

Aztarac at the Centuri.net arcade database
Twin Galaxies high score rankings

1983 video games
Arcade video games
Arcade-only video games
Multidirectional shooters
Vector arcade video games
Video games developed in the United States